Anandarayar Sahib was a poet and administrator who served as a minister in the courts of the Thanjavur Maratha kings Shahuji I, Serfoji I and Tukkoji. He was given the honorific title "Peshwa".

Biography 

Anandarayar Sahib hailed from a prominent Deshastha Brahmin family of the Thanjavur Maratha kingdom. He was dharmadhikari during the reign of Shahuji I and dalavoy in the reign of his successor Serfoji I.

Anandarayar Sahib is mentioned in literary works as "Aiyavayyan". He is credited with having duggen a canal called "Aiyavayyanaru" and  dedicated agraharams as Mangamatam and Sarabhojirajapuram.

Military Campaigns 

Anandarayar led the Thanjavur Maratha forces during the Ramnad war of succession in support of Bhavani Sankar.

Literary works 

There are a number of literary works attributed to Anandarayar Sahib or dedicated to him. Anandarayar composed two works, one in Tamil (Advaita Kirtana) and another in Sanskrit (Sarabhoji Charitra).

Later years 

While some sources claim that Anandarayar Sahib fell out of favour with the king and was thrown in jail where he died broken-hearted, others claim that Seroji later pardoned the minister who retired to Thiruvenkadu where he died.

References 

 

Year of birth missing
Year of death missing
Marathi-language poets
People of the Thanjavur Maratha kingdom